MZN may refer to:
Mazandarani language (مَزِروني, ISO 639-3 code "mzn")
Mozambican metical, currency used in Mozambique
Modified Ziehl-Neelsen, staining method